Franz Brunner may refer to:
 Franz Brunner (handballer) (1913–1991), Austrian handballer
 Franz Brunner (wrestler) (1931–2014), Austrian wrestler